Cockerham is a small village and civil parish within the City of Lancaster district in Lancashire, England. Lying on the River Cocker, at the estuary of the River Lune, the parish had a population of 671 at the 2011 Census.

Cockerham has lain within the historic county boundaries of Lancashire since the Middle Ages, having previously formed a township and parish within the hundred of Lonsdale. Between 1894 and 1974, Cockerham lay within the Lancaster Rural District.

Medieval life of Cockerham manor has been recorded in the Custumal of the Manor of Cockerham, compiled in 1326–1327 and revised in 1463. The custumal, a record of rents and services owed by the tenants to their landlord, combines a local code of laws with an inventory of all resources of the land, from peat fuel, cattle and sheep to shoreline mussels. The tenants were forbidden to trade local fuel to the "strangers" who collected mussels on the shore.

The local church is St. Michael's. The original parish church was in the middle of the village but was resited on higher ground due to frequent flooding.

Close by are the remains of Cockersand Abbey. The village has a pub, the Manor Inn.

Airfields

Its ICAO airport code is GB-0611. It is home to the Black Knights Parachute Centre.

Tarn Farm Airfield (also known as Rossall Field) is two miles south-west of Cockerham, on Gulf Lane. It is home of The Bay Flying Club, West Lancashire Microlight School. Its airport code is GB-0440.

Gallery

See also

Listed buildings in Cockerham

Notes

References
 Bailey, Mark (2002). The English Manor, c. 1200-1500. Manchester medieval sources series. Manchester University Press. .

External links

Cockerham Parish Council
A history of Cockerham – Rosalind Davies
Cockerham at GENUKI

Villages in Lancashire
Geography of the City of Lancaster
Civil parishes in Lancashire
Populated coastal places in Lancashire
Morecambe Bay